The Illinois–Northwestern men's basketball rivalry is an intra-Big Ten Conference, college sports rivalry between the Illinois Fighting Illini and Northwestern Wildcats.

History

Illinois and Northwestern first met on March 7, 1908 with an Illinois victory, 18–13. The teams would continue to compete annually with the exception of 12 seasons. Since the two teams are both in the Big Ten Conference, they meet at least once per season. The location of the game alternates between State Farm Center, formerly Assembly Hall, in Champaign, and in Evanston at Welsh–Ryan Arena. There have only been a total of five neutral site games in this series with Illinois winning all of those games.  Illinois leads the series 137–43.

Occasional feuds and incidents between the schools' programs have fueled the competition over the years. Illinois has the advantage in the history of the Big Ten tournament. Of the 20+ years the conference tournament has been held, Illinois and Northwestern have played a total of 3 times. Illinois holds the record of 3–0 over Northwestern.

Accomplishments by the two rivals
The following summarizes the accomplishments of the two programs.

Through March 18, 2023

Game results
Winning team is shown. Ranking of the team at the time of the game by the AP poll is shown by the team name.

*Denotes game played during the Big Ten tournament

Series statistics 
 Series Record:  Illinois leads 142 to 44
 Current Streak: Illinois, 1 win
 Illinois when ranked: 53-5
 Northwestern when ranked: 0-2
 When both teams are ranked: 0-0
 Illinois Home Record: 72-15
 Northwestern Home Record: 25-57
 Neutral site: Illinois leads 13-4
 In overtime games: Illinois leads 4-2
 Longest Illinois W-Streak: 16, twice (last, 2/4/1984-3/2/1991)
 Longest Northwestern W-Streak: 3, (3/8/1958-3/7/1959)
 Longest Illinois Home W-Streak: 19, (1/5/1980-2/18/1998)
 Longest Northwestern Home W-Streak: 2, four times (Last, 1/23/2010-2/15/2011)
 Longest Illinois Road W-Streak: 8, (2/4/1984-3/2/1989)
 Longest Northwestern Road W-Streak: 3, (1/18/1936-2/12/1940)
 Largest Illinois Home Win Margin: 42, (99-57), 3/8/1995  
 Largest Illinois Road Win Margin: 42, (86-44), 2/27/1943
 Largest Northwestern Home Win Margin: 16, (88-72), 3/8/1958
 Largest Northwestern Road Win Margin: 15, (29-14), 3/2/1917

References

College basketball rivalries in the United States
Big Ten Conference rivalries
Illinois Fighting Illini men's basketball
Northwestern Wildcats men's basketball